Jonas Björkman and Todd Woodbridge successfully defended their title, defeating Mahesh Bhupathi and Max Mirnyi in the final, 3–6, 6–3, 7–6(7–4), 6–3, to win the gentlemen's doubles title at the 2003 Wimbledon Championships

Seeds

  Mahesh Bhupathi /  Max Mirnyi (final)
  Mark Knowles /  Daniel Nestor (quarterfinals)
  Bob Bryan /  Mike Bryan (quarterfinals)
  Jonas Björkman /  Todd Woodbridge (champions)
  Leander Paes /  David Rikl (semifinals)
  Michaël Llodra /  Fabrice Santoro (third round)
  Wayne Arthurs /  Paul Hanley (quarterfinals)
  Martin Damm /  Cyril Suk (quarterfinals)
  Joshua Eagle /  Jared Palmer (third round)
  Wayne Black /  Kevin Ullyett (third round)
  Chris Haggard /  Robbie Koenig (first round)
  František Čermák /  Leoš Friedl (second round)
  Gastón Etlis /  Martín Rodríguez (third round)
  Paul Haarhuis /  Yevgeny Kafelnikov (third round)
  Donald Johnson /  Nenad Zimonjić (third round)
  Tomáš Cibulec /  Pavel Vízner (first round)

Qualifying

Draw

Finals

Top half

Section 1

Section 2

Bottom half

Section 3

Section 4

References

External links

2003 Wimbledon Championships – Men's draws and results at the International Tennis Federation

Men's Doubles
Wimbledon Championship by year – Men's doubles